Hoploscopa ocellata is a moth in the family Crambidae. It was described by George Hampson in 1919. It is found on the Moluccas in Indonesia.

References

Moths described in 1919
Hoploscopini